The Piano Sonata No. 2 in B minor, Op. 35, is a piano sonata in four movements by Polish composer Frédéric Chopin. The first of the composer's three mature sonatas (the others being the Piano Sonata No. 3 in B minor, Op. 58 and the Sonata for Piano and Cello in G minor, Op. 65), the work is considered to be one of the greatest piano sonatas of the literature.

The third movement of the Piano Sonata No. 2 is Chopin's famous funeral march which was composed at least two years before the remainder of the work and has remained, by itself, one of Chopin's most popular compositions. The Piano Sonata No. 2 carries allusions and reminiscences of music by J. S. Bach and by Ludwig van Beethoven;  Beethoven's Piano Sonata No. 12 also has a funeral march as its third movement. A typical performance of Chopin's second sonata lasts between 21 and 25 minutes, depending on whether the repetition of the first movement's exposition is observed.

While the Piano Sonata No. 2 gained instant popularity with the public, critical reception was initially more doubtful. Robert Schumann, among other critics, argued that the work was structurally inferior and that Chopin "could not quite handle sonata form", a criticism that did not withstand time. The work has been recorded by numerous pianists and is regularly programmed in concerts and piano competitions. The Marche funèbre exists in countless arrangements and has been performed at funerals all over the world (including Chopin's own), having become an archetypal evocation of death.

Historical background 
The Piano Sonata No. 2 was written during a time where the sonata lost its overpowering dominance. While the sonatas of Beethoven and Mozart comprised a considerable portion of their compositional output, this is not true of the next generation of composers: Franz Liszt only wrote one sonata among his dozens of instrumental compositions, Robert Schumann seven (eight if including the Fantasie in C, Op. 17), and Felix Mendelssohn thirteen. Besides the Piano Sonata No. 2, Chopin wrote only three other sonatas: the Piano Sonata in C minor (Op. posth. 4), written at the age of eighteen; the Piano Sonata No. 3 in B minor (Op. 58); and the Sonata for Piano and Cello in G minor (Op. 65).

The compositional origins of the Piano Sonata No. 2, the first mature piano sonata Chopin wrote, are centred on its third movement (Marche funèbre), a funeral march which many scholars indicate was written in 1837. However, Jeffrey Kallberg believes that such indications are because of an autograph manuscript of eight bars of music in D major marked Lento cantabile, apparently written as a gift to an unnamed recipient. The manuscript, which is dated 28 November 1837, would later become part of the trio of the Marche funèbre. However, Kallberg suggests this manuscript may have been intended as the beginning of an earlier attempt of a different slow movement instead of being part of the Marche funèbre, writing that "it would have been unusual for Chopin to make a gift of a manuscript that, if it did not contain an entire piece, did not at least quote the beginning of it", as almost all of his other presentation manuscripts did. He also suggests that a four-hand arrangement by Julian Fontana of the Marche funèbre may be connected with an abandoned piano sonata for four hands that Chopin wrote in 1835, originally to be published as his Op. 28 (which was instead appropriated to the 24 Preludes, Op. 28), therefore raising the possibility that the movement may actually date from 1835 instead of the generally accepted 1837.

Some time after writing the Marche funèbre, Chopin composed the other movements, completing the entire sonata by 1839. In a letter on 8 August 1839, addressed to Fontana, Chopin wrote:

Haslinger's unauthorised dissemination of Chopin's early C minor sonata (he had gone as far as engraving the work and allowing it to circulate, against the composer's wishes) may have increased the pressure Chopin had to publish a piano sonata, which may explain why Chopin added the other movements to the Marche funèbre to produce a sonata. The work was finished in the summer of 1839 in Nohant (near Châteauroux), in France, and published in May 1840 in London, Leipzig, and Paris. The work was not furnished with a dedication.

Analysis 

The sonata comprises four movements:

I. Grave – Doppio movimento 
5–7 minutes
 The first movement is in a modified sonata form in B minor and  time. It opens with a four-bar introduction in the relative major, D major marked Grave, followed by a tempo change to Doppio movimento, a key change to the tonic key, and the introduction of an agitated bass accompanimental figure; four bars later, the main theme enters. The main theme, marked agitato, is followed by a second theme, in D major, which is marked piano and sostenuto. In the beginning of the development, all of the themes introduced in the exposition appear. Later in the development, a seemingly new tune, which is actually an inversion of part of the second theme, is introduced. In the climax of the development, Chopin combines three elements at once: the motifs from the Grave introduction and the main theme in the bass and treble respectively, with crotchet triplets in the middle. In the recapitulation, the principal section containing the main theme does not return, possibly inspired by the older binary sonata form typical of Domenico Scarlatti's keyboard sonatas; instead, only the lyrical second theme returns in the tonic's parallel major of B. The movement is closed with a brilliant 12-bar  stretto which forms a coda of 12 bars, ending in three B major chords marked  (fortississimo).

Repeat of the exposition 
When the sonata was published in 1840 in the usual three cities of Paris, Leipzig, and London, the London and Paris editions indicated the repeat of the exposition as starting at the very beginning of the movement (at the Grave section). However, the Leipzig edition designed the repeat as beginning at the Doppio movimento section. Although the critical edition published by Breitkopf & Härtel (that was edited, among others, by Franz Liszt, Carl Reinecke, and Johannes Brahms) indicate the repeat similarly to the London and Paris first editions, almost all 20th-century editions are similar to the Leipzig edition in this regard. Charles Rosen argues that the repeat of the exposition in the manner perpetrated by the Leipzig edition is a serious error, saying it is "musically impossible" as it interrupts the D major cadence (which ends the exposition) with the B minor accompanimental figure. Edward T. Cone agrees, calling the repeat to the Doppio movimento "nonsense". However, Leikin advocates for excluding the Grave from the repeat of the exposition, citing in part that Karol Mikuli's 1880 complete edition of Chopin contained a repeat sign after the Grave in the first movement of the Piano Sonata No. 2. Mikuli was a student of Chopin from 1844 to 1848 and also observed lessons Chopin gave to other students – including those where this sonata was taught – and took extensive notes.

Most commercial recordings exclude the Grave from the repetition of the exposition, including those of Vladimir Ashkenazy, Arturo Benedetti Michelangeli, Murray Perahia, Maurizio Pollini, Martha Argerich, and Li Yundi; however, the recordings of Mitsuko Uchida, Yulianna Avdeeva and Janusz Olejniczak, among others, begin the repetition from the Grave. Other recordings, including those of Sergei Rachmaninoff, Arthur Rubinstein, Vladimir Horowitz, Evgeny Kissin, and Garrick Ohlsson, exclude the repetition altogether.

II. Scherzo 
6–7 minutes

The second movement is a scherzo in E minor and  time with no tempo indication. Anatole Leikin suggests that the absence of the tempo indication can be explained by the close similarities of this movement and the closing section of the first movement, including the prevalence of repeated octaves and chords in both movements, and the identical cadential phrases. Therefore, the absence of a tempo indication may suggest that there is no new tempo, but instead a mere change of notation (from triplets to triple metre).

The movement is in the conventional scherzo-trio-scherzo form with the trio in G major. The scherzo's explosive rhythmic and dynamic power, as well as its furious insistence on repeated chords and octaves, places it in the tradition of the scherzo movements of Beethoven. However, unlike Beethoven, whose scherzos are transformed minuets, this scherzo has many defining rhythmic characteristics that make it a transformed mazurka instead. The trio, marked Più lento, has a songlike quality to it with its simple, sensuous melody. Following the return of the scherzo is a coda that is a condensed reprise of the trio and therefore ends the work in the relative major; other works of Chopin that also end in the relative major include the Scherzo No. 2 in B minor (Op. 31) and the Fantaisie in F minor (Op. 49).

III. Marche funèbre: Lento 

8–9 minutes

The third movement, titled Marche funèbre, is a "stark juxtaposition of funeral march and pastoral trio". The movement is in B minor and  time with the trio in the relative major of D. The tempo designation, Lento, was not added until after the sonata's publication in 1840. The movement opens with a melody consisting of just a repeated B for almost three measures accompanied by alternating B (without the third) and G major chords that ring like a funeral bell. This melodic device was also used as the backbone for the main theme of the preceding Scherzo movement and part of the coda of the opening movement. The melody following the repeated B, is, as Alan Walker notes, "a strict retrogade" of the first movement's main theme. The trio of the movement, which is in the tonic's relative major, consists of a serene nocturne-like melody accompanied by quavers in the left hand.

The Marche funèbre alone has remained one of Chopin's most popular compositions and has become an archetypal evocation of death.   It has been widely arranged for other instrumentations, most notably for orchestra. The first known orchestral arrangement of the movement was made by Napoléon Henri Reber and was played at the graveside during Chopin's own burial on 30 October 1849 at Père Lachaise Cemetery in Paris. The English conductor Henry Wood made two orchestrations of the Marche funèbre, the first of which was played at The Proms on four occasions between 1895 and 1904. For the First Night of the 1907 Proms on 17 August 1907, Wood conducted a new version he had written on learning of the death two days earlier of the renowned violinist Joseph Joachim. In 1933, Sir Edward Elgar transcribed the Marche funèbre for full orchestra; its first performance was at his own memorial concert the next year.  It was also transcribed for large orchestra by the conductor Leopold Stokowski; this version was recorded for the first time by Matthias Bamert.

Although the movement was originally published as Marche funèbre, Chopin changed its title to simply Marche in his corrections of the first Paris edition. In addition, whenever Chopin wrote about this movement in his letters, he referred to it as a "march" instead of a "funeral march". Kallberg believes Chopin's removal of the adjective funèbre was possibly motivated by his contempt for descriptive labels of his music. After his London publisher Wessel & Stapleton added unauthorised titles to Chopin's works, including The Infernal Banquet to his first scherzo in B minor (Op. 20), the composer, in a letter to Fontana, wrote:

In 1826, a decade before he wrote this movement, Chopin had composed another Marche funèbre in C minor, which was published posthumously as Op. 72 No. 2.

IV. Finale: Presto 
1–2 minutes

The short finale, marked Presto and in  time, is a perpetuum mobile in "relatively simple" binary form consisting of parallel octaves played sotto voce e legato (similarly to the Prelude in E minor, Op. 28 No. 14) and not a single rest or chord until the final bars with a sudden fortissimo B bass octave and a B minor chord ending the whole piece. In this movement, "a complicated chromaticism is worked out in implied three- and four-part harmony entirely by means of one doubled monophonic line"; very similarly, the five measures that begin J. S. Bach's Fugue in A minor (BWV 543) imply a four-part harmony through a single monophonic line. Garrick Ohlsson remarked that the movement is "extraordinary, because he’s written the weirdest movement he's ever written in his whole life, something which truly looks to the 20th century and post-romanticism and atonality". Additionally, Leikin describes the finale as "probably the most enigmatic piece Chopin ever wrote", and Anton Rubinstein is said to have remarked that the fourth movement is the "wind howling around the gravestones".

Chopin, who wrote pedal indications very frequently, did not write any in the Finale except for the very last bar. Although Moritz Rosenthal (a pupil of Liszt and Mikuli) claimed that the movement should not be played with any pedal except where indicated in the last measure, Rosen believed that the "effect of wind over the graves", as Anton Rubinstein described this movement, "is generally achieved with a heavy wash of pedal".

Allusions 

The Piano Sonata No. 2 draws an allusion to the Prelude from Bach's Cello Suite No. 6 in D major, BWV 1012. A frequently repeated motif of Bach's Prelude is noticeably similar to the main theme of the first movement of Chopin's sonata; in addition, similarly to the Finale of Chopin's sonata, the Prelude is a perpetuum mobile with four groups of quaver triplets per bar. In addition, in the Finale, Chopin borrowed from Bach the craft of achieving polyphony through a monophonic line by the means of arpeggiated figures: in some respects, he even went further than Bach in this regard. In addition, the plan of Chopin's sonata directly follows that of Beethoven's Piano Sonata No. 12 in A major, Op. 26, which also is in four movements and features a Marcia funèbre slow movement: like Chopin's sonata, the slow funeral march movement follows the fast scherzo second movement. Chopin is usually regarded as the Romantic era composer least influenced by Beethoven; however, Beethoven's Op. 26 was reportedly his favourite Beethoven sonata, and he played and taught it more than any other Beethoven sonata.

Reception and legacy 
Although the Piano Sonata No. 2 was quick to gain popularity among the public, it initially confused the critics, who found it lacked cohesion and unity, and remarked that Chopin could not quite handle sonata form. Most of the critical reviews written in the century following the work's publication were negative, although critics were still very complimentary about certain aspects of the sonata. The sonata, along with Chopin's two other mature sonatas, was performed very sporadically in Poland and other countries in Europe prior to 1900; however, the Marche funèbre by itself was performed often, both for piano and in transcriptions. It was not until the turn of the century that the sonatas were performed more often. Recent commentaries suggest that the notions that the work suffers from structural inferiority and that Chopin could not handle sonata form are slowly fading away, and it is now considered one of the greatest piano sonatas of the literature. The sonata now continues to regularly appear on concert programs and is frequently performed in classical music competitions, especially the Chopin International Piano Competition.

The first major criticism, by Robert Schumann, appeared in 1841. Schumann was critical of the work. He described the sonata as "four of [his] maddest children under the same roof" and found the title "Sonata" capricious and slightly presumptuous. He also remarked that the Marche funèbre "has something repulsive" about it, and that "an adagio in its place, perhaps in D-flat, would have had a far more beautiful effect". In addition, the finale caused a stir among Schumann and other musicians. Schumann said that the movement "seems more like a mockery than any [sort of] music", and when Felix Mendelssohn was asked for an opinion of it, he commented, "Oh, I abhor it". James Huneker remarked that the four movements of the sonata "have no common life", and that the sonata "is not more a sonata than it is a sequence of ballades and scherzi." Despite these remarks, he called the last two movements "masterpieces" and wrote that the finale has "no parallel in piano music". Similarly, James Cuthbert Hadden wrote that "the four movements, regarded separately, are admirable, but taken together they have little thematic or other affinity," and also concurred with Schumann's description of the sonata as "four of his maddest children" bound together. Henry Bidou considered the work "not very coherent", and remarked that "Schumann has pointed out the defect in its composition".

Despite the negative reaction to the work, the reception of the Marche funèbre itself was generally positive, and according to Hadden, writing in 1903, the work had been "popularised to death". Franz Liszt, a friend of Chopin's, remarked that the Marche funèbre is "of such penetrating sweetness that we can scarcely deem it of this earth", and Charles Willeby wrote that it is by far "the most beautiful and consistent movement" of the work. Despite criticising the sonata as a whole, Hadden conveyed the opinion that the Marche funèbre "is really the finest movement in the Sonata".  The Marche funèbre alone continues to be one of Chopin's most enduringly popular compositions, and is performed at funerals around the world. In addition to Chopin's own funeral, it was also performed at the state funerals of John F. Kennedy, Sir Winston Churchill, Margaret Thatcher, Queen Elizabeth II, and those of Soviet and Communist leaders, including Leonid Brezhnev, Yuri Andropov, and Josef Broz Tito. The movement was also played at the state funeral of Polish president Lech Kaczyński, and Egyptian presidents Anwar Sadat and Hosni Mubarak.

The sonata, mainly the Marche funèbre, played an influence in a variety of both classical and non-classical compositions written after it. The second movement of Erik Satie's Embryons desséchés, entitled "of an Edriophthalma", uses a variation on the Marche funèbre'''s second theme. Satie labels it "Citation de la célèbre mazurka de SCHUBERT" ("quotation from the celebrated mazurka of Schubert"), but no such piece exists. In addition, the Marche funèbre is sampled in a number of jazz compositions, including Duke Ellington's "Black and Tan Fantasy", and the Canadian electronic dance music musician deadmau5 used the theme from the Marche funèbre'' in his song "Ghosts 'n' Stuff". Professional wrestler The Undertaker quotes the opening of the March in his entrance theme, as part of his macabre gimmick. This sonata also influenced Sergei Rachmaninoff in his Piano Sonata No. 2 (Op. 36), also in B minor. While explaining to his friends why he decided on a new 1931 version, Rachmaninoff said: "I look at my early works and see how much there is that is superfluous. Even in this sonata so many voices are moving simultaneously, and it is too long. Chopin's Sonata lasts nineteen minutes, and all has been said".

Available editions and recordings 

Several highly acclaimed editions are available of the Piano Sonata No. 2, most notably the editions of G. Henle Verlag, the edition edited by Ignacy Jan Paderewski, and the Chopin National Edition edited by Jan Ekier. The work has been widely performed and recorded. Two of the earliest commercial recordings of the work were made by Percy Grainger and Sergei Rachmaninoff in 1928 and 1930 respectively. Commercial recordings have also been made by such pianists as Alfred Cortot, Daniel Barenboim, Alexander Brailowsky, Samson François, Emil Gilels, Vladimir Horowitz, William Kapell, Wilhelm Kempff, Evgeny Kissin, George Li, Murray Perahia, Ivo Pogorelić, Antonio Pompa-Baldi, Arthur Rubinstein, Mitsuko Uchida, and Chopin International Piano Competition winners Martha Argerich, Yulianna Avdeeva, Seong-Jin Cho, Maurizio Pollini, Adam Harasiewicz, Li Yundi, and Garrick Ohlsson.

References

Notes

Citations

Sources

 
  
 
 
 
 
 
 
 
 
 
 
 
 
 
 
 
 
 Oleksiak, Wojciech (2015-02-23). "3. Funeral March" in Breaking It Down: Chopin's Funeral March at

External links 
 

Piano sonatas by Frédéric Chopin
1839 compositions
Compositions in B-flat minor